Dmytro Ryzhuk (born 5 April 1992) is a Ukrainian football midfielder who plays for FC Okzhetpes.

Career
Ryzhuk is a product of the FC Dynamo youth sport school.

He made his debut in the Ukrainian Premier League as playing for FC Metalist in the match against FC Dynamo Kyiv on 1 March 2015.

References

External links

1992 births
Living people
Ukrainian footballers
Association football defenders
Footballers from Kyiv
FC Dynamo-2 Kyiv players
FC Metalist Kharkiv players
Hapoel Acre F.C. players
Hapoel Afula F.C. players
FC Chornomorets Odesa players
FC Minsk players
FC Okzhetpes players
Ukrainian Premier League players
Liga Leumit players
Ukrainian expatriate footballers
Expatriate footballers in Israel
Ukrainian expatriate sportspeople in Israel
Expatriate footballers in Belarus
Expatriate footballers in Kazakhstan
Ukrainian expatriate sportspeople in Belarus
Ukraine youth international footballers
Ukraine under-21 international footballers
Ukrainian First League players
Ukrainian expatriate sportspeople in Kazakhstan